The Big Mouth is a 1967 American comedy film produced, directed, co-written, and starring Jerry Lewis. It was filmed in San Diego and features Frank De Vol as an onscreen narrator.

Plot
Gerald Clamson is a bank examiner who loves fishing on his annual two-week holiday.  Unfortunately, one day at the ocean he reels in Syd Valentine, an injured gangster in a scuba diving suit.  Syd tells Gerald about diamonds he has stolen from the other gangsters and hands him a map. Gerald escapes as frogmen from a yacht machine-gun the beach.  They swim ashore, locate Syd and gun him down. Their leader Thor ensures Syd's demise by firing a torpedo from his yacht that goes ashore, blowing a crater into the beach.

As the police ignore Gerald's story, Gerald heads to the Hilton Inn in San Diego where Syd claimed the diamonds were hidden.  There he meets Suzie Cartwright, an airline stewardess. While searching  for the diamonds, he needs to avoid the hotel staff after inadvertently hurting the manager. Gerald disguises himself as a character similar to Professor Julius Kelp from The Nutty Professor, while trying to stay one step ahead of the other gangsters who are on his tail, as well as the hotel detectives led by the manager—all the while courting Suzie. As each of the gangsters see Gerald, an identical lookalike to the deceased Syd, they have nervous breakdowns; one imagining himself a dog, one turning into a Larry Fine lookalike, the other becoming a stutterer. The one man Gerald meets who believes him, and identifies himself as an FBI special agent, turns out to be an escapee from an insane asylum.

The movie climaxes in a chase through Sea World San Diego, where Gerald is pursued by Thor's mob, a rival group of gangsters who had made a deal with Syd to buy his diamonds, and a group of Chinese who smuggle the diamonds disguised as plastic pearls.  Gerald disguises himself as a Kabuki dancer but is pursued until Suzie rescues him by flying by with a helicopter and dropping a rope ladder that Gerald escapes on. They return to the Pacific Ocean, where Syd reappears. The rival gangsters chase Syd into the ocean, and Gerald and Suzie walk away, deeply in love.  The diamonds are never located.

The final scene shows the narrator, Bogart, facing the camera and solemnly announcing that the tale is true—then the camera pulls back as De Vol turns and walks away on the breakwater where the beginning and ending action had taken place. De Vol is wearing all of a business suit except trousers, and he is carrying a briefcase.

Cast
 Jerry Lewis as Gerald Clamson / Syd Valentine
 Harold J. Stone as Thor
 Susan Bay as Suzie Cartwright
 Buddy Lester as Studs
 Del Moore as Mr. Hodges
 Paul Lambert as Moxie
 Jeannine Riley as Bambi Berman
 Leonard Stone as Fong
 Charlie Callas as Rex
 Frank De Vol as Bogart (as Frank DeVol)
 Vern Rowe as Gunner
 David Lipp as Lizard
 Vincent Van Lynn as Fancher 
 Mike Mahoney as Detective #1
 Walter Kray as Detective #2
 John Nolen as F.B.I. Agent
 Eddie Ryder as Specs

Production
The Big Mouth was filmed from December 5, 1966 to February 28, 1967 in the newly built Hilton San Diego hotel at Mission Bay and marked the film debut of Charlie Callas after he met Lewis on a chat show as well as a cameo by Colonel Harland Sanders.

Reception
On Rotten Tomatoes, the film holds a 40% rating based on 5 reviews, with an average rating of 4.65/10.

See also
List of American films of 1967

References

External links
 

1967 films
1967 comedy films
American comedy films
Columbia Pictures films
1960s English-language films
Films directed by Jerry Lewis
Films set in San Diego
Films about organized crime in the United States
Films with screenplays by Jerry Lewis
Films with screenplays by Bill Richmond (writer)
Films produced by Jerry Lewis
1960s American films